Epoxybutane may refer to:

 1,2-Epoxybutane
 1,4-Epoxybutane (tetrahydrofuran)
 2,3-Epoxybutane

Epoxides